Kamloops-South Thompson is a provincial electoral district in British Columbia, Canada, established by the Electoral Districts Act, 2008.  It was first contested in the 2009 general election.

Geography
As of the 2020 provincial election, Kamloops-South Thompson comprises the eastern portion of the Thompson-Nicola Regional District. It is located in central British Columbia. Communities in the electoral district consist of Kamloops, south of the Thompson river and Chase.

Member of Legislative Assembly 
On account of the realignment of electoral boundaries, most incumbents did not represent the entirety of their listed district during the preceding legislative term. Claude Richmond, British Columbia Liberal Party was initially elected during the 2005 election to the Kamloops riding and didn't seek re-election. Kevin Krueger, BC Liberal sought re-election in the adjacent redrawn riding of Kamloops-South Thompson during the 2009 election rather than in the riding of Kamloops-North Thompson.

History

Electoral history 

|-

 
|NDP
|Tom Friedman
|align="right"|8,132
|align="right"|34.90%
|align="right"|
|align="right"|$45,531

|- style="background:white;"
! style="text-align:right;" colspan="3"|Total Valid Votes
!align="right"|23,299
!align="right"|100%
|- style="background:white;"
! style="text-align:right;" colspan="3"|Total Rejected Ballots
!align="right"|97
!align="right"|0.41%
|- style="background:white;"
! style="text-align:right;" colspan="3"|Turnout
!align="right"|23,396
!align="right"|57.56%
|}

References

British Columbia provincial electoral districts
Kamloops